Buljubašić is a Bosnian, Croatian and Serbian surname derived from the Ottoman military rank Boluk-bashi.

Notable people with the surname 
  (born 1964), Bosnian army officer
 Faruk Buljubašić (born 1972), Bosnian songwriter
  (born 1988), Croatian economist
 Ivan Buljubašić (born 1987), Croatian water polo player
  (born 1990), Croatian literary critic
 , Croatian folk poet and Gusle player
 Sabrina Buljubašić (born 1988), Bosnian footballer

See also
 Boluk-bashi, military rank
 Bölükbaşı, Turkish surname

Bosnian surnames
Croatian surnames
Serbian surnames